Sixt-sur-Aff (literally Sixt on Aff; ; Gallo: Sitz) is a commune in the Ille-et-Vilaine department in Brittany in northwestern France.

Population
Inhabitants of Sixt-sur-Aff are called Sixtins in French.

See also
Communes of the Ille-et-Vilaine department

References

External links

Official website Sixt-sur-Aff 

Mayors of Ille-et-Vilaine Association 

Communes of Ille-et-Vilaine